Sold is a 2022 Indian Kannada-language drama directed by Prerana Agarwal. The cinematography is done by Sameer Deshpande. The film stars Kavya Shetty, Deepam Kohli and Shivani Ballakuraya. The music is composed by Jeet Singh.

Cast 
Kavya Shetty as Ruchitha
Danish Sait 
Deepam Kohli 
Shivani Ballakuraya

Release
The film was released on 4 January 2022.

References

External links 
 

Indian drama films
2020s Kannada-language films
2022 films
Films shot in Karnataka
2022 drama films